is a railway station in Edogawa, Tokyo, Japan, operated by the East Japan Railway Company (JR East).

Lines
Hirai Station is served by the Chūō-Sōbu Line.

Station layout

Platforms

History
Hirai Station opened on 28 April 1899.

Passenger statistics
In fiscal 2010, the station was used by an average of 31,198 passengers daily.

Surrounding area
 Arakawa River
 Edogawa Boat Racing Circuit

References

External links
 
 JR East Hirai Station information 

Railway stations in Japan opened in 1899
Sōbu Main Line
Chūō-Sōbu Line
Stations of East Japan Railway Company
Railway stations in Tokyo
Edogawa, Tokyo
1989 establishments in Japan